John Perry Pardee (April 19, 1936 – April 1, 2013) was an American football linebacker and the only head coach to helm a team in college football, the National Football League (NFL), the United States Football League (USFL), the World Football League (WFL), and the Canadian Football League (CFL).  Pardee was inducted into the College Football Hall of Fame as a player in 1986.

Playing career

As a teenager, Pardee moved to Christoval, Texas, where he excelled as a member of the six-man football team. He was an All-America Fullback at Texas A&M University and a two-time All-Pro with the Los Angeles Rams (1963) and the Washington Redskins (1971).  He was one of the few six-man players to ever make it to the NFL, and his knowledge of that wide-open game would serve him well as a coach.

Pardee was one of the famed Junction Boys, the 1954 Texas A&M preseason camp held in Junction, Texas, by football coach Paul "Bear" Bryant.  He was part of the 35 left from the approximately 100 players who went to Junction. After completing college at Texas A&M, Pardee was selected with the 1st pick of the second round (14th overall) in the 1957 NFL Draft by the Los Angeles Rams as a linebacker. Pardee played for the Rams from 1957 to 1970, sitting out the 1965 season to treat a malignant melanoma in his left arm.

Pardee was traded from the Rams to the Redskins in a multi-player deal during the first round of the 1971 NFL Draft on January 28, 1971.
He ending his playing career after two seasons with the Redskins at the end of the 1972 NFL season.

Coaching career

WFL
When the World Football League started in 1974, Pardee got his first head coaching job with the Washington Ambassadors. The team later relocated to Norfolk, Virginia as the Virginia Ambassadors before finally moving to their third and final home in Orlando as the Florida Blazers.  The Blazers made it to the 1974 World Bowl and lost by one point to the Birmingham Americans. Pardee's regular-season coaching record in 1974 with the Blazers was 14–6, and 2–1 in the 1974 WFL Playoffs and World Bowl. This was all the more remarkable considering that the Blazers went unpaid for the last three months of the season.  Some of the Blazers players relocated to San Antonio as the Wings for the 1975 season, and Pardee also moved on, signing on as head coach of the Chicago Bears for the 1975 season.

First stint as a Head Coach in the NFL
In 1975, Pardee was hired by the Chicago Bears as head coach.  He spent the next three years there, leading Chicago to their first playoff berth in 14 years in 1977, before moving on to the Washington Redskins. In 1979, he led the Redskins to within one game of making the playoffs, but in the season's final week, they squandered a 13-point lead to the eventual NFC East champions Dallas Cowboys and missed the playoffs. He was fired after going 6-10 in 1980. In 1981, he was hired as assistant head coach in charge of defense for the San Diego Chargers.

USFL
In 1984, Pardee returned to his native Texas by becoming the head coach of the Houston Gamblers.  The Gamblers played spring football in the United States Football League.  The Gamblers had one of the most potent offenses in pro football, the run and shoot offense, with Jim Kelly as quarterback.  The Gamblers merged with the New Jersey Generals in 1986, and Pardee was named head coach.  With Kelly and Doug Flutie both vying for the role of starting quarterback, and Herschel Walker in the backfield, the Generals were poised to dominate the USFL, but the league folded prior to the 1986 season.

NCAA
Pardee returned to Houston in 1987 as head coach at the University of Houston.  During his three-year stint, the Cougars, using the same offense he coached in the USFL, produced the first-ever African American quarterback to win the Heisman Trophy, Andre Ware. His team also became the first major college team in NCAA history to have over 1,000 total offensive yards in a single game, racking up 1,021 yards while beating SMU, 95–21.

Not long after Pardee's arrival, however, Houston was slapped with crippling NCAA sanctions due to numerous major violations under his predecessor, Bill Yeoman.  Among them, the Cougars were banned from bowl games in 1989 and 1990 and kicked off live television in 1989.  As a result, most of the nation never got a chance to see the Cougars set numerous offensive records during the 1989 season.

Second stint as a Head Coach in the NFL
In 1990, Pardee packed up the run and shoot offense and moved across town, and back to the NFL, by joining the Houston Oilers.  He spent five years coaching a team which made the playoffs each of his first four years there, led by Hall of Fame quarterback Warren Moon. In 1991, the Oilers won their first division title since 1967 in the American Football League. It was during his time with the Oilers that Pardee fell victim to NFL notoriety during the 1992 season, when in that season's playoffs, the Oilers surrendered a 35-3 third quarter lead to the Buffalo Bills, losing in overtime to the eventual conference champions 41-38. 

The Oilers won another division title in 1993 on the strength of winning their last 11 games. However, after losing in the second round of the playoffs, owner Bud Adams made good on a threat to hold a fire sale if they didn't make the Super Bowl. The highest-profile loss was Moon, who was traded to the Minnesota Vikings. Without Moon, the Oilers were a rudderless team. Pardee was fired following a 1-9 start to the 1994 season, and was replaced by defensive coordinator Jeff Fisher.

CFL comes to America
He continued his coaching career in the Canadian Football League.  In 1995, he was named head coach of the CFL Expansion Team, the Birmingham Barracudas.  Canadian football is more wide-open than American football, with a field that has an additional 10 yards added to each endzone, as well as a 55 yardline and wider field. Birmingham owner Art Williams thought Pardee's roots in the six-man game made him a natural fit.  The "Cudas" were part of a failed experiment to expand the CFL into the United States.  With Matt Dunigan at quarterback, Birmingham made the playoffs, but lost in the first round.  However, due to dreadful attendance late in the season and the league's refusal to approve the team's proposed relocation to Shreveport, Louisiana, for 1996, the 'Cudas were shuttered at the end of the season along with the CFL's other American teams.

Return to coaching
In December 2007, Pardee, then 71, was contacted by athletic director Dave Maggard about the vacant head coaching job at the University of Houston.  Signaling interest, he made it as far as a finalist for the position, but the school moved forward with Oklahoma co-offensive coordinator Kevin Sumlin.

Personal life
Pardee was married for 50 years to Phyllis Lane Perryman and had five children and 12 grandchildren. Pardee's youngest son, Ted, is the color commentator for the Houston Cougars football radio broadcasts.

In November 2012, Pardee was diagnosed with gallbladder cancer and it was reported by his family that he only had six to nine more months to live, The cancer spread to other organs and Pardee moved to a Denver hospice.

Pardee died April 1, 2013. The family has established a memorial scholarship fund in Pardee's name at the University of Houston. He was survived by his wife Phyllis, five children, and 12 grandchildren. His grandson Payton Pardee is currently Tight Ends Coach at Texas A & M University-Commerce  after playing Wide Receiver at the University of Houston. Jack's youngest grandson, Luke Pardee is currently a Quarterback at Texas Christian University ,

Head coaching record

USFL

College

NFL

CFL

References

External links
 
 
 

1936 births
2013 deaths
American football fullbacks
American football linebackers
Birmingham Barracudas coaches
Chicago Bears head coaches
Houston Cougars football coaches
Houston Oilers head coaches
Los Angeles Rams players
Texas A&M Aggies football players
Washington Redskins head coaches
Washington Redskins players
National Football League defensive coordinators
Florida Blazers coaches
College Football Hall of Fame inductees
Western Conference Pro Bowl players
People from Audubon County, Iowa
People from Tom Green County, Texas
Coaches of American football from Iowa
Players of American football from Iowa
Coaches of American football from Texas
Players of American football from Texas
Deaths from cancer in Colorado
Deaths from gallbladder cancer